The 2018 Barbados Premier League (officially the Digicel Premier League for sponsorship reasons) is the 72nd season of the highest tier of football in Barbados. The season began on 11 March and ended on 8 July 2018.

Format
The 12 teams will be divided into two zones of six teams each. Each team will play the other teams in their own zone twice and the teams in the other zone once, for a total of 16 matches. The teams finishing first in each zone will play in the championship match for the title, while the teams finishing second in each zone will play in the third place match. The teams finishing last in each zone will be relegated, while the teams finishing fifth will play over two matches with the loser also relegated.

Teams change
Promoted from previous season
Empire
Silver Sands
Porey Springs

Relegated from previous season

Regular season

Zone 1

Zone 2

Championship final

Third-place match

Relegation playoff

First Leg

Second Leg

Waterford Compton relegated.

References

External links
Barbados Football Association

Barbados Premier Division seasons
Barbados
Barbados
football